The 2011 Asian Women's Volleyball Championship was the sixteenth edition of the Asian Championship, a biennial international volleyball tournament organised by the Asian Volleyball Confederation (AVC) with Chinese Taipei Volleyball Association (CTVBA). The tournament was held in Taipei, Taiwan from 15 to 23 September 2011.

Pools composition
The teams are seeded based on their final ranking at the 2009 Asian Women's Volleyball Championship.

Preliminary round

Pool A

|}

|}

Pool B

|}

|}

Pool C

|}

|}

Pool D

|}

|}

Classification round
 The results and the points of the matches between the same teams that were already played during the preliminary round shall be taken into account for the classification round.

Pool E

|}

|}

Pool F

|}

|}

Pool G

|}

|}

Pool H

|}

|}

Classification 13th–14th

|}

Classification 9th–12th

Semifinals

|}

11th place

|}

9th place

|}

Final round

Quarterfinals

|}

5th–8th semifinals

|}

Semifinals
93-

|}

7th place

|}

5th place

|}

3rd place

|}

Final

|}

Final standing

Awards
MVP:  Wang Yimei
Best Scorer:  Kim Yeon-koung
Best Spiker:  Kim Yeon-koung
Best Blocker:  Yang Junjing
Best Server:  Wei Qiuyue
Best Setter:  Yoshie Takeshita
Best Libero:  Nam Jie-youn

See also
 List of sporting events in Taiwan

References

 Match Results of 16th Asian Sr. Women's Volleyball Championship

External links
 Asian Volleyball Confederation

V
A
Asian women's volleyball championships
V